Garma is the sixth and final studio album by Australian band, Yothu Yindi that was released in August 2000 via Mushroom Records. The album peaked at number 66 on the ARIA Charts.

Track listing
 "Macassan Crew" (Mandawuy Yunupingu, Stuart Kellaway, Jodie Cockatoo Creed, Andrew Farriss)
 "Fire" (Mandawuy Yunupingu, Kellaway, Cockatoo Creed, Farriss)
 "Surfin' The Log" (Mandawuy Yunupingu, Kellaway, Cockatoo Creed, Farriss)
 "Community Life" (Mandawuy Yunupingu, Kellaway, Cockatoo Creed, Farriss)
 "Bush" (Mandawuy Yunupingu, Farriss)
 "Ghost Spirits" (Kellaway, Makuma Yunupingu, Mandawuy Yunupingu, Lamar Lowder)
 "Romance at Garma" (Mandawuy Yunupingu, Kellaway, Cockatoo Creed, Farriss)
 "Good Medicine" (Cockatoo Creed, Farriss)
 "Calling Every Nation" (Mandawuy Yunupingu, Cockatoo Creed, Farriss)
 "Wirrkul Girl" (Mandawuy Yunupingu, Farriss)
 "Lonely Tree" (Mandawuy Yunupingu, Kellaway, Cockatoo Creed, Farriss)
 "Gone Is The Land" (Mandawuy Yunupingu, Gurrumul Yunupingu, Farriss)
 "Silver Owl" (Mandawuy Yunupingu, Kellaway)
 "Gawulny (Silver Light)" (Traditional song, arranged by Mandawuy Yunupingu)

Personnel
 Mandawuy Yunupingu – lead and backing vocals, clapsticks
 Jodie Cockatoo Creed – lead and backing bocals
 Makuma Yunupingu – lead vocals
 Rrawun Maymuru – backing vocals, didgeridoo, clapsticks
 Gapanbulu Yunupingu Mununggurr – didgeridoo
 Yomunu Yunupingu – didgeridoo
 Stuart Kellaway – clapsticks, bass, guitars, backing vocals
 Cal Williams – electric/acoustic guitars
 Gurrumul Yunupingu – electric/acoustic guitars
 Ben Hakalitz – drums
 Scott Saunders – keyboards
 Andrew Farriss – keyboards, guitars, bass, harmonica
 Joe Accaria – drums
 Nick Cicere – drums
 Anja Tait – violin
 Michele Rose – pedal steel
 Mark Williams – backing vocals
 Tina Harrod – backing vocals

Charts

Release history

References

Yothu Yindi albums
Mushroom Records albums
2000 albums